Kin punishment is the practice of punishing the family members of someone who is accused of committing a crime, either in place of or in addition to the perpetrator of the crime. It refers to the principle in which a family shares responsibility for a crime which is committed by one of its members, and it is a form of collective punishment.
Kin punishment has been used as a form of extortion, harassment, and persecution by authoritarian and totalitarian states. Kin punishment has been practiced in many Western countries, and they include pre-Christian European cultures, Nazi Germany, the Soviet Union, and it has also been practiced in non-Western countries, including China, Japan, and North Korea.

Traditional examples

Europe
Traditional Irish law required the payment of a tribute (Éraic) in reparation for murder or other major crimes. In the case of homicide, if the attacker fled, the fine had to be paid by the tribe to which he belonged.

In medieval Welsh law, the kin of an offender was liable to make compensation for his wrongful act. This penalty (called Galanas) was generally limited to murder.

The medieval Polish Główszczyzna fine functioned similarly to the Anglo-Saxon and Scandinavian weregild.

Arabia
Traditional Arab society, which is clan-based, strongly adheres to the concept of collective responsibility. Bedouins recognize two main forms of penalty for a crime against a member. These are blood revenge, referred to as Qisas (قصا, "revenge") and blood money, Diyya (دية, "blood money"/"ransom"). In cases of severe crimes such as murder and rape, blood revenge is the proscribed punishment. If a murder occurs, clansmen of the victim have the right to kill the murderer or one of his male clansmen with impunity. Certain crimes are liable for multiple acts of revenge, for example, the murder of women and children is avenged fourfold. Crimes considered treacherous, such as the murder of a guest, are also avenged fourfold.

Alternatively, a crime punishable by blood revenge can be commuted to a severe fine if the family of the offended party agrees to it. Blood money is paid jointly by the clan of the offending member to the clan of the victimized member. Bedouins differentiate between crimes in which the group must pay as a standing obligation without reimbursement from the perpetrator of the offense, and crimes where the latter must reimburse them. Crimes where the clan is obligated to pay a joint fee without any reimbursement are murder, violent assault, or insults and other offenses committed during a violent conflict. The collective payment of fines for such crimes is viewed as a justified contribution to the welfare of the injured party, rather than a penalty to the perpetrator. Other offenses given a blood-price are crimes against property and crimes against honor. Concepts based on the Arabian laws of blood revenge and blood money are found in Islamic Sharia law, and are thus variously adhered to in Islamic states.

China

China historically adhered to the concept of liability among blood relatives. During the Qin and Han dynasties, families were subject to various punishments according to the punishment of the offending member. When the offense was punishable by death by severing the body at the waist, the offender's parents, siblings, spouse, and children were executed.  When the offense was punishable by death and public display of the body, the offender's family was subject to imprisonment with hard labor.  When the offender's sentence was exile, their kin was exiled along with them. The most severe punishment, given for capital offenses, was the Nine familial exterminations (zú zhū (族誅), literally "family execution", and miè zú (灭族/滅族)), implemented by tyrannical rulers. This punishment entailed the execution of all the close and extended kin of the individual, categorized into nine groups: four generations of the paternal line, three from the maternal line, and two from the wife's. In the case of Confucian scholar Fang Xiaoru, his students and peers were uniquely included as a tenth group.

Modern examples

Communist states

Soviet Union 
In the Soviet Union, during Joseph Stalin's 1930s Great Purge, many thousands of people were imprisoned to Gulag as "relatives of the enemies of the people", using the Repression of Family Members of Traitors of the Motherland clause as a basis. One well-known example was Anna Larina, the wife of Nikolai Bukharin, who was imprisoned after her husband was accused of treason. The NKVD Order No. 00689, signed in 1938, rolled back some of the more extreme measures, as such that only spouses who were informed of their partner's political activities were arrested.

China 
Similar practices took place in the People's Republic of China during the Cultural Revolution of the 1960s. A prominent example is Deng Pufang, who was arrested and tortured by the Red Guards when his father, Deng Xiaoping, was purged by Mao Zedong.

North Korea 
Numerous testimonies of North Korean defectors confirm the practice of kin punishment (연좌제, yeonjwaje literally "association system") in North Korea, under which three generations of a political offender's family can be summarily imprisoned or executed. Such punishment is based on internal Workers' Party protocols and lies outside of the formal legal system. Relatives are not told why they fell under suspicion and the punishment extends to children born in prison. The association system was introduced with the North Korean state's founding in 1948, having previously existed under the Joseon kingdom.

Historical and Nazi Germany

In traditional Germanic law, the law of Germanic peoples (before the widespread adoption of Roman canon law) accepted that the clan of a criminal was liable for offenses committed by one of its members. In Nazi Germany, this concept was revived so that the relatives of persons accused of crimes against the state, including desertion, were held responsible for those crimes.

Israel
The Israeli government's use of home demolition within territories occupied in 1967 was condemned as collective punishment on account that the homes of terrorists are often family homes. As a result of internal and international pressure against the practice an appeals process against demolition was established in 1989, and consequently the number of demolitions declined. However, in subsequent periods of violence the house demolition policy has been frequently employed as a deterrent against terrorism. In an effort to stop suicide bombings during the Second Intifada, the Supreme Court of Israel in July 2002 accepted the legality of expelling family members of terrorists from the West Bank to the Gaza Strip if they were found to have abetted the terrorist's activities. They argued that it was not a general deterrent because it limited the use of expulsion to cases where "that person, by his own deeds, constitutes a danger to security of the state." Expulsion to Gaza was discontinued after Israel's unilateral disengagement from the Gaza Strip.

Venezuela 
The  concluded in a September 2021 report that Venezuelan security and intelligence agents reportedly applied the principle of Sippenhaftung, using methods including and kidnapping and detention of relatives of critics, real or perceived, to accomplish arrests.

See also

 Blood vengeance
 Cycle of violence

References

Collective punishment
Kinship and descent